Shruti Pathak is a Filmfare Award-nominated Indian playback singer and lyricist working in Hindi film industry.

Early life
She is a Gujarati, and was born and brought up in Ahmedabad, she moved to Mumbai to pursue singing as a career after finishing her master's degree in Psychology.

Career
Pathak began her singing career after singing for various remix albums. Her "Leke Pehla Pehla Pyaar" for the Baby Doll series in 2004. With her song "Mar Jawa" from Fashion (2008) Pathak became popular. She earned nominations in both Filmfare and Screen Awards for the song. She is also the lyricist along with being singer of the song "Payaliya" from Dev.D (2009). In 2013 she wrote one more song "Shubhaaramabh" for Amit Trivedi in Kai Po Che.

She has also done many stage shows. She has performed at the Culrav 2012 Cultural fest of Motilal Nehru National Institute of Technology Allahabad, the Flare (Techno-Cultural Fest) of Pandit Deendayal Petroleum University, Gandhinagar, the Protsahan 13 Cultural, Sports and Technical Festival of SVKM's NMIMS University Shirpur Campus Dhule on 1 April 2013, the Udaan 2014 Cultural Fest of SPIT College, Mumbai organized by Rockfree Entertainment on 22 February 2014, and the Silver Jublee event of Lata Mangeshkar Hospital, Nagpur on 22 December 2015.

Pathak has also appeared all three seasons of Coke Studio India. She sang 'Kya Haal Sunawan' in season 1, 'Glorious' and 'Shedding Skin' in season 2 and 'Haal Ve Rabba' in season 3. She appeared on MTV Unplugged season 4 with Sachin - Jigar. She also on the Dewarists.

She learned classical from her guru Shree Divyang Thakkar from very young age.

Discography

External links

References

Living people
Gujarati people
Indian women playback singers
Bollywood playback singers
21st-century Indian singers
21st-century Indian women singers
Singers from Ahmedabad
Women musicians from Gujarat
Year of birth missing (living people)